The following elections occurred in the year 1839.

Europe

 1839 French legislative election
 1839 Spanish general election

North America

United States
 1839 Massachusetts gubernatorial election
 United States Senate election in New York, 1839/1840

See also
 :Category:1839 elections

1839
Elections